Supermarket Stakeout is an American cooking competition television series that airs on Food Network. It is presented by Iron Chef Alex Guarnaschelli.

Each episode begins with four chefs who have to create dishes from groceries they purchase from customers at a nearby supermarket with a budget of $500 each; with the final chef originally winning a prize of $10,000; this has recently been changed to a year's worth of groceries in the latest episodes.

Supermarket Stakeout officially premiered on August 13, 2019.

On November 20, 2020, it was announced that the third season will premiere on December 29, 2020.

Format

The competition consists of three rounds and is adjudicated by a panel of two judges. It takes place in a supermarket parking lot, with separate stations for each chef to prepare and cook food. They are each given $500 at the outset, which they must use to buy groceries from customers as they depart the market. A limited stock of additional ingredients is available for the chefs' use.

In each round, Guarnaschelli assigns a general type of dish for the chefs to create. They have 45 minutes to buy ingredients and prepare, cook, and plate three servings (one for each judge and a third "beauty plate"). The judges evaluate the dishes on taste, presentation, and how closely they adhere to the theme of the round. The chef whose dish is judged the least satisfactory is eliminated from the competition and must forfeit his/her remaining money. After the third round, the last remaining chef has his/her cash total increased to $10,000.

Each round features different restrictions on shopping. In the first round, chefs must buy groceries sight unseen, but may purchase from as many customers as they wish. In the second round, chefs may only buy one customer's groceries, but may look in the bags before making an offer. In the final round, chefs may only buy five items, but may buy from multiple customers and inspect their bags. During the final minutes, they may enter the market and purchase one additional item of their choice, if they have the money and time to do so.

"What Would Alex Make?" episodes feature footage of Guarnaschelli cooking in her own backyard, intercut with footage of the chefs' competition. During each of the first two rounds, she attempts to use the set of items judged by the producers to be the most difficult, while in the third, she is given a blind choice of grocery bags that each contain the ingredients purchased by one chef. For every round, she combines the given ingredients with additional ones similar to those available for all chefs' use.

Episodes

Season 1 (2019)

Season 2 (2020)

Season 3 (2020–21)

Season 4 (2022) 

This is the current season now airing.

Notes

References

External links
 
 

2010s American cooking television series
2019 American television series debuts
Cooking competitions in the United States
English-language television shows
Food Network original programming
Food reality television series
Television series by Levity Live
2010s American game shows
2020s American game shows